Stenopteron is a genus of moths belonging to the family Tortricidae.

Species
Stenopteron stenoptera (Filipjev, 1962)

See also
List of Tortricidae genera

References

External links
tortricidae.com

Tortricidae genera